Manvendra Singh ( 13 Dec 1947, Agra (Uttar Pradesh)) is a leader of Indian National Congress from Uttar Pradesh. He served as member of the Lok Sabha representing Mathura (Lok Sabha constituency). He was elected to 8th, 9th and 14th Lok Sabha.

References

India MPs 1984–1989
People from Mathura district
1947 births
Living people
Indian National Congress politicians from Uttar Pradesh
India MPs 1989–1991
India MPs 2004–2009
Lok Sabha members from Uttar Pradesh
People from Agra
Bharatiya Janata Party politicians from Uttar Pradesh